Georg Friedrich Karl Freiherr von Hertling, from 1914 Count von Hertling, (31 August 1843 – 4 January 1919) was a German politician of the Catholic Centre Party. He was foreign minister and minister president of Bavaria, then chancellor of the German Reich and minister president of Prussia from 1 November 1917 to 30 September 1918. He was the first party politician to hold the two offices; all the others were non-partisan.

Hertling's Catholicism played an important role in both his academic and political life. He belonged to the conservative wing of the Centre party and resisted moves towards making the government dependent on the will of parliament rather than on the emperor, a stance that helped bring down his government in the final months of World War I.

Education and non-political activities 
Hertling came from a Catholic family of civil servants from the Grand Duchy of Hesse. He was born in Darmstadt, the son of the Hessian court councilor Jakob Freiherr von Hertling and his wife Antonie (née von Guaita).

The religious education he received through his mother made him consider becoming a priest. He attended the Ludwig-Georgs-Gymnasium where he was a student under a principal who preserved the institute's humanistic character against the emerging natural sciences. He then studied philosophy in Munich, Münster and Berlin, where he received his doctorate in 1864.

He qualified at Bonn in 1867 to teach at the university level, but because he was a professing Catholic it was not until 1880 that he was appointed to an associate professorship. The delay was due to the Kulturkampf (culture struggle) taking place in Prussia between the government under Otto von Bismarck and the Catholic Church, primarily over issues of clerical control of education and ecclesiastical appointments. The experience contributed to Hertling taking a leading role in the 1876 founding of the Görres Society, a learned association for the cultivation of science in Catholic Germany. He remained its president until his death in 1919. Hertling received a full professorship at the University of Munich in 1882. Before that he published books on Aristotle in 1871 and Albertus Magnus in 1880.

Hertling was one of the pioneers of the movement for Catholic student fraternities. He joined the Catholic German Student Fraternity Aenania in Munich in 1862 and later the Catholic Student Association Arminia in Bonn.

Hertling was president of the German Society for Christian Art from its founding in 1893 until 1911.

He was married to Anna Freiin von Biegeleben (1845–1919), from an influential family of civil servants. The Hertlings had one son and five daughters, one of whom died young. Hertling was a great-nephew of the Romantic writer Bettina von Arnim and the poet Clemens Brentano. The actress Gila von Weitershausen (born 1944) is a great-granddaughter.

Member of parliament and Bavarian minister president 
From 1875 to 1890 and 1896 to 1912 Hertling was a member of the German Reichstag as a representative of the Catholic Centre Party. He devoted himself first to sociopolitical issues and later primarily to foreign and financial policy. From 1909 to 1912 he was chairman of the Centre's parliamentary group, advocating the reconciliation of German Catholicism with the predominantly Protestant and Prussian-influenced national state.

On 9 February 1912 the prince regent appointed Hertling chairman of the Bavarian Ministry of State and Bavarian foreign minister, i.e., as minister president, at which time the former regent, then King Ludwig III, also made him a count. The appointment of a representative of the majority party in the state parliament to the office of head of government was a first and indicated the beginning of Bavaria's parliamentarization. Unlike his more liberal predecessor Clemens von Podewils-Dürniz, he had a secure parliamentary base and formed his own cabinet.

Social issues were among the most pressing problems in politics, and in 1913 the Bavarian government drew up plans to provide state support for the unemployed, but these failed in the upper chamber. As a result, demonstrations took place across Bavaria in early 1914.

After the heir to the Austro-Hungarian throne, Archduke Franz Ferdinand, was assassinated in Sarajevo in June 1914, the situation in the Balkans did not come up as an issue at the meeting of the Bavarian Council of Ministers on 15 July. When the minister president of Württemberg, Karl von Weizsäcker, suggested that a Bundesrat committee be convened to find a common position for the smaller federal states, Munich waved it off.

During World War I, Hertling supported the policies of the independent Reich Chancellor Theobald von Bethmann Hollweg. Frederick Augustus II, Grand Duke of Oldenburg, as a spokesman for those who wanted Germany to annex foreign territory following a presumed victory in the war, suggested to the Bavarian King Ludwig III in March 1915 that he demand from Emperor Wilhelm II, on behalf of the German princes, the dismissal of Bethmann Hollweg, who in his opinion was too weak and stood in the way of a "German peace" – i.e., one with annexations. The King, who wanted to enlarge Bavaria after a victory, did not take the step because Hertling was able to prevent the initiative.

The simmering conflict between farmers and city dwellers caused by food shortages during the war was also played out between the parties in the Bavarian parliament and led to ministerial resignations in December 1916, although Hertling remained minister president. Bavaria's social situation grew increasingly worse.

On 31 August 1916 the Supreme Army Command announced the Hindenburg Program developed by Erich Ludendorff and Paul von Hindenburg. It called for drastic measures to increase economic output. Its massive strengthening of imperial power was accompanied by a corresponding weakening of the federal states' ability to act politically.

After the fall of Bethmann Hollweg in July 1917, Hertling declined to assume the Reich chancellorship. Only after the failure of Bethmann's successor Georg Michaelis did Hertling, who was 74 and physically frail, take over the offices of Reich chancellor and minister president of Prussia on 1 November 1917. He was the first party politician to hold the combined posts; all of his predecessors had been career civil servants or military men. It was initially planned to have Michaelis continue in office as Prussian minister president, but he did not have the necessary votes in parliament. In Bavaria Hertling was succeeded in office by the independent Otto von Dandl.

German chancellor and Prussian minister president 
Hertling belonged to the right wing of the Centre Party, which in contrast to its left rejected parliamentarization – that is, having ministers responsible to parliament rather than the emperor. He also feared that it would undermine federalism and strengthen the Social Democratic Party (SPD). Under his Reich chancellorship, the direction of the Centre and of the left-liberal Progressive People's Party, both of which wanted to show consideration for the special rights of the German states, prevailed. Nevertheless, Hertling's government represented an important step towards the parliamentarization of the Reich, since the new chancellor had to reconcile his government program in advance with the majority parties of the Reichstag, the largest of which was the SPD with 35% of the seats, as compared to the Centre's 16%. The Centre was thus given time to become accustomed to "proto-parliamentary governance" and cooperation with the SPD and the left liberals.

With the left-wing liberal Friedrich von Payer of the Progressive People's Party as vice chancellor and Robert Friedberg of the National Liberal Party as deputy Prussian prime minister, two veteran parliamentarians were included in the cabinets as liaison men to the parties. The Social Democrats remained on the outside in order not to complicate the formation of a government. Friedrich von Payer was responsible for liaising between the SPD and the government.

During Hertling's term in office, some important steps were taken toward parliamentarization and democratization, such as an envisaged electoral reform with elements of proportional representation. Overall, however, the SPD was dissatisfied with him because the influence of the Supreme Army Command remained strong and reforms were slow. By the end of September 1918, Hertling had lost the confidence of the SPD, which wanted to enter the government only under a change of policy. The governments of Bavaria and Baden also thought that Hertling was not the right man to develop a consistent peace policy. The Progressive People's Party thought the same but did not want to endanger the coalition.

In view of the deteriorating military situation, the parties of the Inter-Party Committee, including Hertling's Centre Party, called for negotiations for a separate peace with the Allies that would not include annexations, as well as for parliamentarization of the Reich. Through a constitutional amendment, the government was to be made dependent on the confidence of the Reichstag. Hertling was determined to resist these demands. On 26 September 1918, however, department heads in the General Staff informed Paul von Hintze, secretary of state in the Foreign Ministry, of the hopeless military situation, bypassing Quartermaster General Erich Ludendorff, but also failing to involve Reich Chancellor Hertling. Hintze worked out a concept for a revolution from above. When the Supreme Army Command also demanded a broader base for the government on 28 September – probably in order to place the responsibility for the defeat on the democratic parties – Hertling had no way out. The end of his chancellorship was sealed on 29 September at the army's general headquarters in Spa, Belgium. Hertling was succeeded on 3 October by Prince Maximilian of Baden, the preferred candidate of his vice chancellor, Payer.

Georg von Hertling died three months later in his adopted home of Ruhpolding, Bavaria, where he was buried.

Orders and decorations 
 :
 Knight of the Order of Merit of the Bavarian Crown, 1898
 Grand Cross of the Royal Merit Order of Saint Michael, 1912
 Knight of the Royal Order of Saint Hubert
 King Ludwig Cross
 : Grand Cross of the Order of Berthold the First, with Golden Collar
 : Grand Cross of the Order of Henry the Lion
 : Grand Cross of the Merit Order of Philip the Magnanimous, with Crown
  Principality of Lippe: War Merit Cross
 :
 Knight of the Order of the Red Eagle, 1st Class
 Knight of the Royal Order of the Crown, 2nd Class with Star
 Iron Cross (1914), 2nd Class on White Band with Black Edge
  Hohenzollern: Cross of Honour of the Princely House Order of Hohenzollern, 1st Class
 : Grand Cross of the Albert Order, with Golden Star
 : Grand Cross of the Order of the Württemberg Crown
   Austria-Hungary:
 Grand Cross of the Austrian Imperial Order of Leopold, 1913; in Diamonds, 1914
 Grand Cross of the Royal Hungarian Order of Saint Stephen, 1917
  Holy See:
 Grand Cross of the Order of Pope Pius IX
 Grand Cross of the Order of Saint Gregory the Great
 : Grand Cross of the Order of the Cross of Liberty

References

External links 

 Erinnerungen aus meinen Leben  "Recollections from my Life" Vol. I at archive.org. In German
 Erinnerungen aus meinen Leben  "Recollections from my Life" Vol. II at archive.org. In German

 

1843 births
1919 deaths
20th-century Chancellors of Germany
Politicians from Darmstadt
People from the Grand Duchy of Hesse
Counts of Germany
German Roman Catholics
Centre Party (Germany) politicians
Chancellors of Germany
Members of the 3rd Reichstag of the German Empire
Members of the 4th Reichstag of the German Empire
Members of the 5th Reichstag of the German Empire
Members of the 6th Reichstag of the German Empire
Members of the 7th Reichstag of the German Empire
Members of the 10th Reichstag of the German Empire
Members of the 11th Reichstag of the German Empire
Members of the 12th Reichstag of the German Empire
Members of the 13th Reichstag of the German Empire
Ministers-President of Bavaria
Prime Ministers of Prussia
Foreign ministers of Prussia
Members of the Bavarian Reichsrat
German people of World War I
Academic staff of the Ludwig Maximilian University of Munich
Recipients of the Iron Cross (1914), 2nd class
Grand Crosses of the Order of Saint Stephen of Hungary
Knights Grand Cross of the Order of Pope Pius IX
Knights Grand Cross of the Order of St Gregory the Great